Edgar Francisco Reis Sá (born 10 April 1979) is a Portuguese retired footballer who played as a central defender.

Football career
Born in Esmoriz, Aveiro District, Sá spent most of his career with S.C. Covilhã, for whom he played 273 games between the Segunda Liga and the third division, scoring 27 goals in his three spells. He was awarded the club's medal of honour when he left in June 2016 at the age of 37, having already majored in sports science.

At the professional level, Sá also represented F.C. Marco, A.D. Ovarense and C.D. Santa Clara, going on to total 349 appearances.

References

External links
 
 
 Edgar Sá at ZeroZero

1979 births
Living people
People from Ovar
Portuguese footballers
Association football defenders
Liga Portugal 2 players
Segunda Divisão players
C.D. Trofense players
S.C. Covilhã players
F.C. Marco players
A.D. Ovarense players
S.C. Espinho players
C.D. Santa Clara players
Sport Benfica e Castelo Branco players
AD Oliveirense players
S.C. Salgueiros players
Sportspeople from Aveiro District